Kénédougou is one of the 45 provinces of Burkina Faso, located in its Hauts-Bassins Region. The 2019 census reported a population of 399,836.

Its capital is Orodara.

Departments
Kenedougou is divided into 10 departments:
Djigouera
Koloko
Kourignon
Kourouma
Morolaba
N'dorola
Orodara
Samogohiri
Samorogouan
Sindo

See also
Regions of Burkina Faso
Provinces of Burkina Faso
Departments of Burkina Faso

References

 
Kenedougou